Gereon Bollmann (born 20 November 1953) is a German politician for the AfD and since 2021 member of the Bundestag, the federal diet.

Life and politics 

Bollmann was born 1953 in the West German town of Au im Murgtal and became member of the Bundestag in 2021.

References 

Living people
1953 births
Alternative for Germany politicians
Members of the Bundestag 2021–2025
21st-century German politicians
People from Rastatt (district)